Run-O-Waters is a locality in the Goulburn Mulwaree Council, New South Wales, Australia. It is a rural residential area located on the western outskirts of Goulburn, generally to the north of the Hume Highway and Run-O-Waters creek.

References

Towns in New South Wales
Southern Tablelands
Goulburn Mulwaree Council